The Changan Raeton Plus  (锐程 Plus) and the previous Changan Raeton CC (睿骋 CC) is a mid-size sedan produced by Changan Automobile. Despite using the same name, the Raeton Plus and Raeton CC has no connections with the regular Raeton which is Changan's flagship and largest sedan.

The original production Raeton CC was launched in 2017 being a more fastback and coupe-like variant to the regular Raeton sedan. Within the Chinese domestic market, the Raeton CC is classified as an "A+ segment" which is the slightly larger compact car segment, while in dimensions, the 4780mm length of the Raeton CC is practically a D-segment Mid-size car. For the 2020 model year, the Raeton CC received a facelift with the Chinese name completely changed from "睿骋" to "锐程" while still keeping the same pronunciation "Ruicheng". In September 2022, a major update of the fastback sedan was unveiled with a rename to Raeton Plus. 


Changan Raeton CC (2017-2022)

A concept car named the Changan Raeton CC concept was unveiled on the 2015 Shanghai Auto Show in China, but no visual connections have been made to the production version.

The production Raeton CC rides on a different platform from the regular Raeton and is in fact slightly smaller and will be positioned below the regular Raeton sedan. Price of the CC will start from around 89,900 yuan to around 138,900 yuan.

Specifications
The Raeton CC rides on a Changan-developed platform called the P3, which also underpins a crossover by Changan. Power of the Raeton CC comes from a 1.5 liter turbo engine with 155 hp and 225 Nm, mated to a six-speed manual transmission or a six-speed automatic transmission. In terms of chassis, the Raeton CC features front MacPherson-type independent suspension plus rear multi-link independent suspension.

2020 facelift
On October 18, 2019, the 2020 model year of the Changan Raeton CC was officially launched. The updated model has a new Chinese name pronounced as Ruicheng CC (锐程 CC). The 2020 Raeton CC facelift launched a total of five trim levels with a price range of 94,900 to 128,900 yuan (~US$13,410 to US$18,214). The update features a revised front end and the length of the refreshed car has increased by 20mm while the powertrain remains unchanged.

Changan Raeton Plus (2023-)

The Raeton Plus (锐程 Plus) was unveiled during the 2022 Chengdu Auto Show as a major update of the Raeton CC. The interior features facial recognition system and can automatically adjust the seat position, light and other equipment upon recognizing the driver. Driver fatigue monitoring system, 360 degree driving recorder, adaptive cruise control, panoramic camera and wireless mobile charging are also available on the Raeton Plus.

Specifications
The Raeton Plus still rides on the Changan-developed P3 platform and is powered by a 1.5-litre turbocharged engine that produces 188 hp of power and 300 Nm of torque. The engine is paired with a 7-speed dual-clutch gearbox. The fuel consumption of the Raeton Plus is rated at 6.44 liters per 100 kilometers (15.52 km per liter).

References

External links
 

Changan Automobile vehicles
Front-wheel-drive vehicles
Cars of China
Mid-size cars
Sedans
Cars introduced in 2017